Frank Chester may refer to:

Frank Chester (politician) (1901–1966), Canadian politician
Frank Chester (umpire) (1895–1957), English cricketer and umpire

See also
Frank Chester Robertson (1890–1969), American author
F. G. L. Chester (Francis Chester, 1899–1946), British soldier
Chester (disambiguation)